The Secret Court of 1920 was an ad hoc disciplinary tribunal of five administrators at Harvard University formed to investigate charges of homosexual activity among the student population. During two weeks in May and June 1920, "the court", headed by acting dean Chester Noyes Greenough, conducted more than 30 interviews behind closed doors and took action against eight students, a recent graduate, and an assistant professor. They were expelled or had their association with the university severed. Two of the students were later readmitted. The affair went unreported until 2002.

Suicide of Cyril Wilcox
On May 13, 1920, Cyril Wilcox, a Harvard undergraduate, committed suicide by inhaling gas in his parents' house in Fall River, Massachusetts. Newspaper reports called the death accidental. At the time Wilcox had been warned about his poor academic performance and had withdrawn from school for reasons of health. The night before his death, Wilcox had confessed to his older brother, George Lester Wilcox, himself a graduate of Harvard, that he had been having an affair with Harry Dreyfus, an older Boston man.

George, shortly after his brother's death, intercepted two letters to Cyril, one from Ernest Roberts, a Harvard student, and another from Harold Saxton, a recent graduate. Their candid and detailed gossip convinced him that Harvard was harboring a network of homosexual students. On May 22, George Wilcox located Dreyfus, extracted from him the names of three other men involved, and beat him. Later that day, he met with Harvard's Acting Dean Greenough and shared what he knew: his brother's admission, the contents of the letters, and what Dreyfus had told him.

Harvard's response

Formation
Greenough promptly consulted with Harvard president Abbott Lawrence Lowell and the decision was made to bypass the normal and relatively slow-moving student disciplinary process before the Administrative Board made up of faculty members and the dean. Instead, on May 23, 1920, just a day after listening to Wilcox, Greenough formed a special five-man tribunal which has come to be called the "Secret Court", because its files were stored under that name in the university archives. The participants themselves called it "The Court" to distinguish it from the usual Administrative Board. The unspecific name also disguised the subject of its investigations.

Greenough was to head the court. Another senior member was Robert I. Lee, a professor of hygiene and the doctor responsible for the students' annual physical examinations, who had experience posing intimate questions about sexual activity. A third was regent Matthew Luce, whose responsibilities included student discipline and conduct, especially housing and dormitory proctors. They were all roughly 40 years of age or older. Two young assistant deans, Edward R. Gay and Kenneth Murdock, both just a little older than the undergraduates, filled out the court's membership. The court reported to President Lowell, and his rulings were final.

At this point Greenough could identify Roberts, the author of one of the letters to Cyril Wilcox, as the principal target of his inquiry. The same day Greenough formed the court, he spoke to a graduate student in business, Windsor Hosmer. He expected Hosmer, as proctor of Perkins Hall, to be a source for information about Roberts, but he proved unhelpful, either because he was an inattentive proctor or because he preferred not to be candid. He told the dean he knew that Roberts hosted parties, but caused no disturbance and broke no rules. He was given three days to monitor visits to Roberts' room and report both current and past visitors. On May 26, Hosmer gave Greenough a list beginning with Roberts himself, followed by the names of Kenneth Day and Keith Smerage, noted as frequent visitors, then Eugene Cummings and Nathaniel Wolff, and then two more of whom he was "inclined to think that neither is part of the group that has centered around Perkins." A few days later, Hosmer returned to report that the last two boys had objected to his inclusion of their names.

First anonymous letter
An unsigned, typed letter dated May 26 now confirmed and enlarged upon what Greenough had learned from George Wilcox. It probably reached the dean just as the court began interviewing students. The author, identifying himself as a Harvard College junior, described how Cyril Wilcox in his first year fell in with a set of his classmates who "committed upon him and induced him to commit upon them 'Unnatural Acts'" and when he determined he lacked the "strength of character" to stop participating in such activity he killed himself. Roberts was "the leader of this group and directly responsible" for the suicide, he continued:

Then he named as regular participants three students—Kenneth Day, Edward Say and Eugene Cummings—as well as the tutor Saxton, who was already known to Greenough. He pressed home his point by describing the parties where "the most disgusting and disgraceful and revolting acts of degeneracy and depravity took place openly in plain view of all present." Finally he urged the dean on with a rhetorical question: "Isn't it about time an end was put to this sort of thing in college?"

Investigation
The court began its interrogations on May 27, 1920. Greenough summoned each witness with a brief note, for example: "I expect you, whatever your engagement may be, to appear at my office tomorrow, Friday, May 28th, at 2:45 P.M." Another even said: "If necessary you are directed to cut a final examination in order to keep this appointment." Only the court's notes survive, not transcripts, so it is difficult to ascertain the tenor of the exchanges, whether these were conversations, interviews, or interrogations, or perhaps changed in the course of each session. Clearly the court pressed witnesses and challenged them with conflicting facts, since the court's notes record admissions followed by attempts to recant, as well as denials followed by admissions. For example, the court's note for Harold Saxton says "when pushed he practically confessed to one act, but later retracted." And Kenneth Day "confessed to H.S. [homosexual] relations with Roberts, after denial at first."

Many of those interrogated were never charged and have not been identified. That suggests that the court, despite its secrecy, was prepared to reveal its mission to innocent students as it attempted to identify those more closely involved. As the court proceeded, it had increasing amounts of information to use to question witnesses and challenge their statements. Some were called back for follow-up questioning. Nor did the court restrict itself to people with a Harvard affiliation. At least two witnesses lacking a Harvard connection responded to its summons, though it is unclear whether they participated voluntarily or under some threat. One was Ned Courtney, a Boston boy whose name was mentioned in testimony as the "main annoyance" for his frequent telephone calls to Perkins. Another was Harry Dreyfus, who was connected through his relationship with Cyril Wilcox and his employment at the Café Dreyfus, a known homosexual gathering place.

No subject was too personal for the court's inquiry. It posed questions about masturbation practices and engaging in sexual acts with women or men, cross-dressing. and entertaining overnight guests. Less intrusive questions addressed friends and associates, parties attended and what was seen and who was present, reading habits and familiarity with homosexuality, theories about it as well as slang used to describe its practitioners and their activities ("faggoty parties", "tricks"). Soon the court had a list of business establishments to inquire about as well, starting with the Café Dreyfus and adding The Lighted Lamp, The Golden Rooster, and Green Shutters.

Many witnesses found it difficult to lie effectively when the court already had enough circumstantial evidence to use in probing their answers. Others may have decided that the best course was to answer honestly or with relatively honest answers that minimized their involvement. The court's notes say that Kenneth Day "admits he is probably a little tainted. Mind poisoned." Ernest Roberts claimed he was "led astray" by Wilcox and that Day, too, had been "led into it by Wilcox–but not of his own free will." Joseph Lumbard described parties where men danced together and others dressed in women's clothes. The court noted: "some kissing witnessed." Asked why he did not leave such a party, he allowed that he "stayed because he was interested." He had not masturbated for six years. Nathaniel Wolff detailed mutual masturbation with Keith Smerage, but claimed to have ended such behavior. "He was fighting hard and felt that he had overcome the habit. Says he is 90% OK." Smerage in turn said he had not masturbated in nine months and in college "had not slept with men in the unnatural sense." Later the court recorded that he said he had "'fooled' around with the homosexual business" once or twice at Harvard. Stanley Gilkey defended reading Havelock Ellis: "I think a man should know everything." Donald Clark, an assistant professor of philosophy, "denied any connection with homosexualism, and he denied talking about it except to help some students to cure themselves." He later admitted to have propositioned a student, as the court already knew from an earlier interview with the object of Clark's attentions.

Disposition of cases
The court punished ten it found guilty of some offense and the punishments varied with their status and their degree of culpability. It expelled seven College students (Day, Gilkey, Lumbard, Roberts, Say, Smerage, Wolff) and one student in dentistry (Cummings). Four (Day, Gilkey, Lumbard, Wolff) were invited to reapply to Harvard in a year or two. The court also told those expelled to leave Cambridge promptly and complained to the families of those who did not move quickly. All were told that Harvard would reply frankly to requests for recommendations or for explanations for their separation from the school. Refusing to provide a positive reference was all the court could do to Saxon, the tutor, and Clark, the young professor. It identified four others unconnected to Harvard as "guilty" but could not directly punish them. It would try to see that one would lose his job as a waiter at the Café Dreyfus.

Greenough also ordered a letter placed in the files of those it punished to prevent the college's Alumni Placement Service from "making any statement that would indicate confidence in these men." The Placement Service proved efficient in following those instructions. Lumbard found himself blocked by negative responses from Harvard when he applied to Amherst College, the University of Virginia, and Brown University. Dean Otis Randall of Brown even replied sympathetically to praise Harvard's actions: "I feel your action in the matter was wise and just and that you deserve the support of the colleges to which young Lumbard may make application. How frequently we uncover messes of this sort, and how disagreeable it is to deal with such matters." Wolff was treated similarly when applying to McGill University. The Placement Office's standard reply said "Harvard cannot show any confidence in this individual." To a request for Saxon's credentials it spoke of "moral turpitude."

The court warned the students not to delay contacting their families because the court was going to write them promptly. Greenough wrote to Roberts: "The letter that I am sending to your father this morning, although it does not tell him everything, necessitates your telling him everything." To Kenneth Day he wrote: "It would be better for them to hear it from you than from me." The dean's letters about students who had committed no overt act explained the circumstances at length and provided the court's rationale for expulsion in such cases: "The acts in question are so unspeakably gross that the intimates of those who commit these acts become tainted." He made a clear distinction by not criticizing such a student's character, but his judgment, calling him "no worse than ignorant, over-curious, and careless." When it came to those who had engaged in homosexual sex, Greenough withheld details yet tried to underscore the significance of the violation. To Roberts' father, Greenough wrote that his son "has promised to tell you all about the matter, and I hope he will tell you the whole truth. His offense has nothing to do with low scholarship; it is not gambling, or drink or ordinary sexual intercourse. If he does not confess to something worse than these things, he will not have told you the whole story."

The students' parents were troubled, supportive, and forgiving. Responses to Greenough, while always respectful, varied from pleading to polite challenges to the court's judgment. Lumbard's father protested his son's "extremely unjust treatment." Gilkey's father hoped his son would be readmitted to erase the impact of a "penalty out of proportion to his delinquency", Roberts' father noted  "how this dreadful news has upset me" and sought assurances from Greenough that his son had terminated his "evil practices" some months before. Others engaged in protracted correspondence and had employers send testimonials. In Day's case, since he was an orphan, his cousin undertook a long correspondence detailing his cousin's work habits and social contacts. Say's father, a Connecticut grocer, asked to see the evidence against his son, and Greenough replied that he could not send "the great mass of evidence" through the mail, though the actual evidence against Say consisted of a few sentences of testimony that mentioned him. Say's mother wrote as well and indicated she felt that others of greater means like Lumbard were not being treated as harshly as her son: "My son's father is not a doctor, but he is a good, honest working father."

Smerage's mother learned of her son's expulsion when she opened Greenough's letter and the next day initiated a yearlong series of letters on his behalf. She spoke of her "stricken home" and her son's history of illness. Ultimately, she questioned the court's entire approach: "I feel now that you men could have done much good had you perhaps had a little less sense of justice and a little more of the spirit of Jesus in your hearts." Wolff's father asked the dean to recognize that helping his son to reform was more important than punishment: "I am taking the liberty of appealing to you, not in your official capacity, but as a man, to do what you can to assist him. You know all are subject to mistakes, and the blessing is in those who can aid and advise in correcting and saving rather than otherwise."

The court told four students to consider applying for admission in a year or more. Initially Lowell opposed all such applications. Greenough expressed frustration with his stance and eventually won readmission for Gilkey and Lumbard. He expressed especial frustration that Lowell would not readmit Day. Informing Day that he could not return to Harvard, Greenough could only offer personal reflections and assurances: "Two points, however, I beg you to bear in mind. First, the chief thing in this world is to do right and be of service, whether at Harvard or outside. I know that you will keep on trying wherever you are. Secondly, please remember that if there is ever anything I can personally do to help you, I shall be glad to know it and to do it."

Public awareness
Given the number of interviews, and the consequent expulsions, the undergraduate population likely became aware of the court's work in a matter of days. Yet the court's work escaped public attention. At least twice the court was told that Ernest Weeks was threatening to make public his opposition to the court and its methods, but nothing came of that. The court itself in its communications with the students' parents and guardians gave assurances that "every effort has been made to prevent any knowledge of this affair from becoming public."

Yet a few students must have spoken with a reporter. On June 19, the Boston American ran a news story that connected the few public facts: two Harvard students, friends, both from Fall River, Massachusetts, had died within a month of one another: Cyril Wilcox "accidentally killed by gas" at home on May 13 and dentistry student Eugene Cummings a suicide in the infirmary on June 11. Cummings, the story went on, had told friends about "an alleged inquisition, which he claimed was held in the college following Wilcox' death." He had been taken to a room "shrouded in gloom" and "questioned exhaustively." College authorities denied his story and said it was the product of his "disordered mind." Finally, court member Roger I. Lee put an end to further inquiries. Cummings, he told the Boston American, "had been acting in a queer manner," using an adjective that indicated Cummings' underlying condition was not fit for public discussion. Contemporary press coverage ended with that one article.

Second anonymous letter
A second anonymous letter reached the court as it concluded its work. The author upbraided the court for failing to identify "most, if not all" of those students guilty of homosexual activity. The court, according to the author, mishandled its investigation by concentrating on the Roberts group, which encompassed only half of the 50 students the court should have identified. The others disliked the Roberts set and had "little cliques of their own." They now "continued their practices within the student body and continued spreading it." The letter also said that the court's methods, such as the grilling Cummings described and using expulsion as its consistent punishment, were not well considered. It argued that offering more lenient treatment like "probation, etc." in return for additional names of associates would have accomplished more. The identity of the letter's author remains unknown.

The court took no action in response to this critique. On commencement day, June 22, less than 4 weeks after the Court began interviewing students, the senior class exercises in Sanders Theatre were followed by another ceremony at the stadium. "The usual spreads and dances at clubs and fraternity houses were arranged....Rain fell at frequent intervals during the evening, putting a damper on the outdoor program."

In July, in a somewhat different context, Greenough claimed the court did all it could with the evidence it extracted from its witnesses. Grace Smerage, the mother of expelled student Keith Smerage, had complained to Greenough that Harvard had just graduated others her son said were as guilty as he or more so. Greenough replied on behalf of the court: "We certainly cannot be held responsible for not acting on evidence we did not possess, especially when we have asked all the boys we have summoned if they had anything further to tell us. If boys choose to shield those who are guilty they must accept the incomplete results of a Board acting upon information which is inadequate because the boys themselves have chosen to let it be inadequate."

Investigators

Edward R. Gay served as Assistant Dean of Harvard College from 1919 to 1923. He was born in London to American parents and served in World War I as a second lieutenant of artillery. Though a college administrator at the time of the court, he only received his Harvard diploma magna cum laude in 1922. Following his years at Harvard, he worked as a newspaper copy editor and then embarked on a distinguished business career in the paper industry, ending as Vice Chairman of the Board of St. Regis Paper Company. He died at his home in New York City on July 18, 1966.

Chester Noyes Greenough was a professor of English serving a two-year term as Acting Dean of Harvard College in 1920. Born in Wakefield, Massachusetts, in 1874, he graduated from Harvard in 1898 and became a professor of English in 1915. In the 1920s he held the post of dean in his own right and became the first Master of Dunster House, serving from 1930 to 1934. One of his publications became a popular textbook. He died on February 27, 1938. Greenough Hall, a Harvard dormitory, is named for him.

Roger I. Lee was head of the Department of Hygiene. As doctor to the students, he conducted their annual physical examinations. He was born in 1881 and at Harvard he earned his bachelor's degree in 1902 and medical degree in 1905. He served as a lieutenant colonel in the Medical Corps in World War I. Upon his return from service he authored Health and Disease: Their Determining Factors. As a reaction to the discovery that so many World War I recruits were unfit for service, he initiated at Harvard one of the first collegiate fitness programs in 1919. He was a professor of hygiene from 1914 to 1924 and later served as a member of the Harvard Corporation from 1931 to 1954. He played a prominent role in several medical organizations, notably as President of the American Medical Association in 1945-46. He retired from the practice of medicine at 80 and died October 29, 1965, at the age of 84.

Abbott Lawrence Lowell was in his tenth year as president of the university. He was born in Brookline, Massachusetts, in 1856, the scion of a famous family. He graduated from Harvard College cum laude in 1877 and from Harvard Law School in 1880. After practicing law, he taught at Harvard and in 1909 began his 24-year tenure as President of Harvard University. An educational reformer, he implemented a new set of academic requirements for Harvard undergraduates that required them to concentrate in a particular discipline beginning in 1914. He established a distinctive profile as a defender of academic freedom in the years during and after World War I. His tenure was marked by controversies about his proposed establishment of a quota to limit the admission of Jewish students and his attempt to exclude African American students from residing in the freshman halls. He implemented Harvard College's residential house system in 1930 and retired in 1933. He died in 1943.

Matthew Luce was Harvard's regent in 1920, the administrative officer charged with responsibility for the welfare and conduct of the student population. He supervised residence hall proctors and student organizations. He was a Harvard graduate from the class of 1891. During World War I he served as assistant secretary of the Massachusetts Food Administration. When appointed regent in 1919, he worked at a firm of wool dealers, Luce and Manning, and was a trustee of the Massachusetts Society for the Prevention of Cruelty to Children. He served as regent until his resignation in 1935. Upon his resignation, the Harvard Crimson described him as "obscure by preference and by the nature of his functions, and an officer of the University unknown to students who followed the relatively straight and narrow path....Since he acted as an intermediary without disciplinary authority, his office was largely what he himself wanted to make it, and he considered it a roving commission to pour oil on troubled waters."

Kenneth Murdock was an Assistant Dean of Harvard College. A Boston native, he was just 25 years old at the time of the Court. He graduated from Harvard summa cum laude in 1916 and then served in World War I as an ensign in the Navy. He then returned to the college as assistant dean, while his father, a successful banker, was serving on a committee that was reorganizing the university's finances. He later earned his doctorate in English from Harvard and enjoyed a distinguished academic career as Francis Lee Higginson Professor of English Literature, Dean of the Faculty of Arts and Sciences (1931–36), and the first Master of Leverett House (1930–41). Among his many publications were Literature & Theology in Colonial New England and The Notebooks of Henry James, which he edited with F. O. Matthiessen. He died in 1975.

Witnesses and other parties
Donald Clark was a 24-year-old graduate of Wesleyan University, an assistant professor of philosophy at Harvard, and a Ph.D. candidate there. Fluent in Italian, German and French, he served during World War I as a special agent in the U.S. Department of Justice. He received a master's degree in philosophy from Harvard in 1918 and was in the third year of his Ph.D. program when the court summoned him for an interview after a student claimed to have been propositioned by Clark. As a mark of the court's profound concern about Clark's status as an instructor, Harvard president Lowell attended his interrogation. Clark confessed to having homosexual sex on a number of occasions. The Court told him he would have to withdraw from the Ph.D. program and would not be reappointed to his teaching position. He was expected to finish grading examinations. Later Lowell crossed Clark's name off all school records. Clark taught for a while at Mills College and at the David Mannes School of Music, published a book of poetry and translations from Italian and German. He worked as a librarian at the National Jewish Hospital in Denver until his death from tuberculosis at age 47 in 1943.

Ned Courtney had no relationship with Harvard. He worked as a waiter at the Café Dreyfus and probably had sex with several Harvard students. Nevertheless he responded to the court's summons and submitted to its questioning. The court's notes indicate that Harvard would do what it could to terminate his employment.

Eugene R. Cummings was a 23-year-old student just three weeks from completing a program in dentistry. He was homosexual and thoroughly embedded in the group of students the court was targeting. Soon after he faced the court's questioning, he became ill and checked himself into Harvard's Stillman Infirmary. A few days later, on June 11, before being notified that he was expelled, he used his medical knowledge to commit suicide using drugs available there. His death provoked the only press coverage of the court's work.

Kenneth Day was a popular student athlete and the roommate of Cyril Wilcox, whose suicide triggered the creation of the court. He admitted to sexual relations with men and was expelled. Though told he might be considered for readmission, his repeated requests were denied. He married in April 1926 and moved to New York, where he worked as a head bank teller. He had two daughters, was widowed late in life, and married twice more.

Harry Dreyfus was born Henry Arthur Dreyfus on January 24, 1891. He was 8 years older than Cyril Wilcox, the Harvard student with whom he had an affair. He worked at the Café Dreyfus, which was known in certain circles as a gathering place for homosexuals, in the hotel his father owned in Boston. Though in no way connected to Harvard, he submitted to the court's interrogation. The court terminated its interview notes with the words "No action possible." He moved to Providence in the late 1920s, where he lived as a bachelor. He died in September 1978 in Miami.

Stanley Gilkey, a sophomore from New Hampshire and the son of a Congregational minister, was probably having sexual relations with other men, but he successfully lied to the court about his associates and judgments. The court expelled him for associating too closely with Roberts, for demonstrating an interest in the subject of homosexuality, and for claiming the ability to recognize homosexuals. He admitted reading works by Havelock Ellis, but explained that his interest in homosexuality was just part of his more general interest in criminology. Though expelled, the court had no evidence he had participated in homosexual activity. His request to be readmitted was granted in 1921 and he graduated in 1923. He lived in Paris for two years, then returned to the United States, where he produced ten Broadway shows over 20 years. He died in Pacifica, California, in 1979.

Windsor Hosmer was born in upstate New York in 1894. After two years at Harvard, he interrupted his studies to serve in the Ambulance Corps with the French army in World War I and then returned to graduate in 1919. During the court's investigations he was a graduate student in business and the proctor of Perkins Hall. He earned his Harvard MBA in 1921. He then taught briefly at Harvard Business School before moving to Hobart College. He returned to Harvard in 1931 and became a full professor in 1937. He published several accounting texts and served as an adviser on accounting to the United States Atomic Energy Commission in the 1950s. He set up and helped manage two small businesses and tried to establish a formal program in small business management at Harvard Business School. With two colleagues he published Small Business Management in 1966. He retired from teaching in 1963.

Joseph Lumbard was a 19-year-old student who, in the court's judgment, was "too closely connected" with others who had committed homosexual acts, including his roommate, Edward Say, who was "deeply involved." Lumbard had come to terms with Say's odd behavior and showed him a measure of sympathy. For not segregating himself from his roommate's friends and for showing too much curiosity he was expelled. Not having committed a homosexual act, Lumbard gained readmission in 1921 and graduated from Harvard Law School in 1925. Harvard twice provided explanations for Lumbard's expulsion, once in 1931 when he was being considered for employment by the U.S. Attorney's office and again in 1953 when President-elect Dwight D. Eisenhower was considering him for a seat on the United States Court of Appeals. In the second case, at least, Harvard's registrar reported that he gave the FBI "the facts in the case clearing L[umbard] of any question," saying that Lumbard had been expelled "solely because of association with [the homosexual] group spacially." Lumbard married in 1929. Better known as J. Edward Lumbard, he had a long and distinguished legal career in private practice and in government and died in 1999.

Ernest Weeks Roberts made his rooms the center of the homosexual social scene. His letter to Cyril Wilcox, arriving after the latter's suicide, made his sexual position clear. He was the son of retired U.S. Representative Ernest William Roberts and had served during World War I in the Harvard unit of the Students' Army Training Corps (SATC). Despite his poor academic performance, he hoped to enter Harvard Medical School. The court expelled him. He married less than a year later, saw the birth of Ernest Jr. at the end of 1921, and enjoyed a successful career as an interior decorator.

Harold Winfield Saxton was a 25-year-old Harvard graduate working as a tutor to Harvard students. The court had the incriminating letter he wrote to Cyril Wilcox and he contradicted himself when giving testimony. The court banished him from the university and thereafter he had difficulty finding employment when Harvard refused to recommend him. After teaching at a variety of schools around the country, as well as in England, Saxton eventually returned home to Chelsea, Massachusetts, where he remained at his parents' home until at least 1942. Nothing further is known of his life.

Edward Say was 20 years old and had a rather delicate constitution after spending years recovering from a spinal deformity. He insisted he had never engaged in any homosexual activity, though other witnesses before the court claimed that he had. After the court expelled him, he returned to Connecticut and worked as a securities salesman. He was active in his church and remained unmarried when he was killed in the crash of a car in which he was a passenger on July 13, 1930.

Keith Smerage was a junior and a member of the Dramatic Club. To the court he confessed to a variety of homosexual contacts before realizing that the court would not respond to honesty with leniency. In a confrontational conclusion, he told the court he could add 50 additional names to the few he had already furnished, but would not. He later claimed the court had tricked him into confessing by lying about the evidence against him. After being expelled, Smerage became assistant manager of his mother's inn in Topsfield, Massachusetts. He had some jobs in regional theater productions, using "Richard Keith" as his stage name, once playing the lead in Tangerine. He was out of work when he killed himself by inhaling household gas in his Greenwich Village apartment on September 8, 1930.

Nathaniel Wollf was a 25-year-old from Buffalo, New York, just days away from graduating, when he volunteered to Greenough that he had information about the suicide of Cyril Wilcox and was quickly swept up in the court's investigation. When interviewed he described several homosexual experiences but asserted he had made a clean break. The Court expelled him and refused his requests for re-admittance though it had initially offered hope that he might return. Wollf's application for admittance to McGill University was also denied because of Harvard's report of the reason for his expulsion. Wollf earned a medical degree at Bellevue Hospital Medical College in New York City. After studying psychiatry for three more years, he spent ten years pursuing painting and academic interests. He traveled widely and briefly converted to Islam. He opened a nightclub in Barcelona in 1935. During World War II, he returned to the United States and he served as a psychiatrist for returning soldiers. He then practiced medicine in Mexico. He never married and died in London in 1959.

Revelations and interpretations
In 2002, Amit Paley, a researcher from The Harvard Crimson, the school's undergraduate daily newspaper, came across a box of files labeled "Secret Court" in the university archives. After a protracted campaign on the part of the paper's staff, the university released five hundred documents relating to the court's work. An article by Paley in The Crimsons weekly magazine Fifteen Minutes reported the 1920 events on November 21, 2002. Though the university insisted on redacting the names of those under investigation, six researchers at the paper were able to identify most through research in other records.

Harvard president Lawrence Summers responded to that story in this way:

An editorial in The Crimson two weeks later called on the university to grant "posthumous honorary degrees" to those expelled and not allowed to return. It also charged that by failing to reveal the names of the students involved "the university implies that they were accused of some legitimate transgression."

In a letter to the editor the next week, Gladden J. Pappin, a Harvard junior and editor of a conservative campus magazine, the Harvard Salient, objected to the editorial's proposed degrees and called the court's work "a very appropriate disciplinary move." He also called for the administration to "reestablish standards of morality" and punish violators, noting that "such punishments would apply to heterosexuals, of course, but even more so to homosexuals, whose activities are not merely immoral but perverted and unnatural." In a similar vein, conservative commentator Pat Buchanan wrote: "Harvard appears to have quietly expelled a few deviates while avoiding a public scandal that would have ruined their reputations and damaged Harvard’s good name. What did Harvard do wrong?...Harvard has not only turned its back on its Christian past, it has just renounced its Christian roots as poisoned and perverted." Two editors of the Salient resigned over the letter.

A book-length study of the Court, Harvard's Secret Court was written by William Wright and published by St. Martin's Press in 2005. A popular dramatization, the book recounts the court's actions in detail, while also including imagined conversations and speculation. Where only the notes of an interrogation survive, the author reconstructs the questions and at times characterizes the tone of voice of the questioners.

In 2008, Michael Van Devere wrote, produced, and directed a different kind of dramatization: a film based on the court's work called Perkins 28: Testimony From the Secret Court Files of 1920. The film consists of reenactments of nine of the court's interrogation sessions and uses a cast of Harvard undergraduates. The screenplay uses the court's documents as its starting point.

In 2010, a movement called "Their Day in the Yard", aiming to petition Harvard to grant posthumous honorary degrees to the expelled students, launched a Facebook page and a website. On February 28, 2012, the university said in a statement that it "does not award posthumous degrees except in the rare case of a student who completes all academic requirements for the degree but dies before the degree has been conferred." The Harvard Crimson reported that at least 28 posthumous degrees were granted to former students who did not complete their academic requirements before dying in World War I. In 2019, "Secret Court 100", a student-led centennial effort advocating for the conferral of posthumous degrees and other improvements for BGLTQ students at Harvard was founded, and has since led several panels and events. 

Two stage works dramatizing the court and the affected students have been presented in New York. In 2010, VERITAS, by Stan Richardson, was presented at the New York International Fringe Festival, and in 2011 Classic Stage Company presented Unnatural Acts: Harvard's Secret Court of 1920, conceived by Tony Speciale and created by members of the Plastic Theatre.

References
Notes

Bibliography
 The Harvard Crimson:
Amit R. Paley, "The Secret Court of 1920, Part I" November 21, 2002, accessed December 17, 2009
Amit R. Paley, "The Secret Court of 1920, Part II", November 21, 2002, accessed July 21, 2012
Amit R. Paley, "The Secret Court of 1920: How We Discovered An 82-Year Secret," November 21, 2002, accessed July 21, 2012
Paley's article was published in the Harvard Crimson'''s weekly supplement Fifteen Minutes, where the article was not divided into parts and the section called "How We Discovered An 82-Year Secret" was a sidebar.
 The Harvard Crimson: "Silenced Voices Finally Speak Out in 'Perkins 28'," November 13, 2008, accessed December 17, 2009
Lee,  Roger I. (1917) Health and Disease: Their Determining Factors. Boston: Little, Brown, and Company,
 The New York Times: "In Harvard Papers, a Dark Corner of the College's Past," November 30, 2002, accessed December 17, 2005
 The Washington Post: "Harvard Secret Court Expelled Gay Students in 1920," December 1, 2002, accessed December 17, 2009
 Wright, William. Harvard's Secret Court: The Savage 1920 Purge of Campus Homosexuals'' (New York: St. Martin's Press, 2005),

External links
 Michael Van Devere: Trailer for Perkins 28: Testimony from the Secret Court Files of 1920, accessed December 17, 2009
  Perkins 28: Testimony from the Secret Court Files of 1920, the entire film in 9 parts
 Their Day in the Yard
 VERITAS
 Unnatural Acts: Harvard's Secret Court of 1920

1920s in LGBT history
Academic scandals
Harvard University
1920 in the United States
LGBT history in the United States
LGBT in Massachusetts
LGBT and education
History of Harvard University